T with middle tilde ( ᵵ ) is a letter of the Latin script. At present there is no uppercase version encoded in Unicode. It is used in the International Phonetic Alphabet for a velarised or pharyngealised voiceless alveolar stop.

Encoding

Latin letters with diacritics